Naran Huleg ( foaled 5 April 2016) is a Japanese Thoroughbred racehorse. A specialist sprinter he showed good, but unremarkable form in his early career, winning a race on dirt as a two-year-old in 2018 and three minor races on turf in the following year. He failed to win for over two years before winning the Tanzanite Stakes in December 2021 although he ran well in defeat in several races in the interim. As a six-year-old in 2022 he recorded an upset victory in the Grade 1 Takamatsunomiya Kinen.

Background
Naran Huleg is a chestnut horse with a broad white blaze bred in Japan by Setsuko Sakato. He was sent into training with Yoshitada Munakata and initially raced in the ownership of Kimio Saijo.

He was from the twelfth crop of foals sired by Gold Allure, a leading performer on dirt in Japan whose wins included the Tokyo Daishōten, Japan Dirt Derby, Derby Grand Prix and February Stakes. Naran Huleg's dam Kelley's Beauty was campaigned exclusively on dirt and showed some racing ability, winning four minor races from seventeen starts. She was a distant female-line descendant of the British broodmare Frustrate who was exported to Japan in 1907 and was the ancestor of many major winners in that country.

Racing career

2018: two-year-old season
As a two-year-old in 2018 Naran Huleg was campaigned exclusively on dirt. He made his racecourse debut in a contest for previously unraced juveniles over 1300 metres at Tokyo Racecourse on 8 October when he was ridden by Kyosuke Maruta and started at odds of 6.9/1. He raced in third place before taking the lead in the straight and won by one and three quarter lengths from the filly Kanashibari. In two subsequent starts that year he finished sixth in the Cattleya Sho at Tokyo in November and third in the Kantsubaki Sho at Chukyo Racecourse in December.

2019: three-year-old season

In his race as a three-year-old Naran Huleg finished second to Timing Now in the Gogyo Sho on dirt at Chukyo and then came home sixth in a minor dirt race at Nakayama Racecourse in March. He made his turf debut at Fukushima Racecourse in April and finished unplaced in the Yukiusagi Sho before finishing fifth in a minor race on dirt at Tokyo in the following month. For the rest of his career Naran Huleg raced exclusively on turf. On 27 July at Niigata Racecourse the colt was ridden by Keita Tosaki when he started at odds of 6.4/1 for the Seno Tokubetsu over 1000 metres and won by two lengths from Fast As Ever. At the same track in August he started 3/1 favourite for the Iide Tokubetsu over 1200 metres. Ridden by Tosaki he turned into the straight in twelfth place before launching a strong run on the outside, took the lead 100 metres out and won by one and a half lengths from the four-year-old filly Seiun Ririshii. He went on to finish fifth in the September Stakes over 1200 metres at Nakayama and then came home seventh in the Okutama Stakes at Tokyo in November. On his final run of the year Naran Huleg was ridden by Kyosuke Maruta when he started the 4.6/1 third choice in the betting for the Hamamatsu Stakes over 1200 metres at Chukyo on 15 December. After settling towards the rear of the field he switched to the outside and made rapid progress in the straight, gained the advantage inside the last 200 metres and accelerated away from his rivals in the closing stages to win by two and a half lengths.

2020: four-year-old season
On his first run as a four-year-old Naran Huleg was stepped up in class to contest the Grade 3 Silk Road Stakes over 1200 metres at Kyoto Racecourse on 2 February and finished third behind A Will A Way and Eighteen Girl. He went on to finish sixth in the Listed Shunrai Stakes at Nakayama in April and fifth in the Idaten Stakes at Niigata in May. He ran twice in summer, finishing ninth in the Grade Ibis Summer Dash over 1000 metres at Niigata in July and seventh in the Listed Toki Stakes over 1400 metres at the same track in August. After a break of seven weeks he returned to the track in the Listed Shinetsu Stakes at Niigata on 18 October and came home seventh behind Gendarme.

2021: five-year-old season
Naran Huleg began his fourth campaign in the Listed Yodo Tankyori Stakes over 1200 metres at Chukyo on 9 January and finished second to Travesura, beaten one and a half lengths by the winner. He then ran sixth in the Shunrai Stakes in April, second to Kurino Gaudi in the Kurama Stakes at Chukyo in May and fourth in the TVH Sho at Sapporo Racecourse in June. Before the last of these races he had been transferred to the ownership of Katsushige Muraki. He made little impact in his next two races, finishing tenth in the Toki Stakes on 29 August and tenth again behind Resistencia in the Centaur Stakes at Chukyo on 12 September. He showed better form on his next start as he ran second to Savoir Aimer in the Listed Opal Stakes over 1200 metres at Hanshin on 9 October. Naran Huleg had been without a win for over two years when he contested the Tanzanite Stakes over 1200 metres at Hanshin on 18 December and started the 3.3/1 second favourite in a fifteen-runner field. After being restrained towards the rear by Maruta he weaved his way through the field in the straight and got up in the final strides to win by a neck from Leggiero.

2022: six-year-old season

On his first run of 2022 Naran Huleg ran for the second time in the Silk Road Stakes and finished third behind Meikei Yell and Shine Garnet, beaten just over a length by the winner. On 5 March at Nakayama he ran second to Gendarme in the Grade 3 Ocean Stakes.

Naran Huleg was then stepped up to Grade 1 class for the first time and started a 26.9/1 outsider for the Takamatsunomiya Kinen over 1200 metres on soft ground at Tokyo on 27 March. Resistencia started favourite while the other sixteen runners included Grenadier Guards, Salios, Meikei Yell, Kurino Gaudi and Gendarme. After racing towards the rear as usual Naran Huleg began to make rapid progress along the inside rail in the straight. In the last 200 metres he threaded his way through the field, joined the leaders in the final strides and prevailed in a five-way blanket finish, winning by a neck from the five-year-old mare Lotus Land with Kir Lord, Travesura and Meikei Yell finishing just behind. Yoshitada Munakata, who was winning his first Grade 1 race as a trainer commented "I’m very happy and a bit relieved... Though we would have preferred a better ground, he showed his usual strong charge in the stretch against a strong field." Kyosuke Maruta said "Racing from the rear is his usual style so I just concentrated on keeping the horse’s rhythm. He has never experienced heavy ground before but handled it well. I took him through the inner course with confidence as I did in the Tanzanite Stakes. I was really happy when we were able to break free before the wire."

On 5 June Naran Huleg was stepped up in distance to contest the Yasuda Kinen over 1600 metres at Tokyo. He started a 51/1 outsider and came home ninth of the eighteen runners behind Songline.

Pedigree

Naran Huleg is inbred 4 × 4 to Hail To Reason, meaning that this stallion appears twice in the fourth generation of his pedigree.

References

2016 racehorse births
Racehorses bred in Japan
Racehorses trained in Japan
Thoroughbred family 1-b